Didecyldimethylammonium chloride (DDAC) is a quaternary ammonium compound used as antiseptic/disinfectant.  It causes the disruption of intermolecular interactions and the dissociation of lipid bilayers.  The bacteriostatic (prevent growth) or bactericide (kill microorganism) activity of DDAC depends on its concentration and the growth phase of the microbial population. It is a broad spectrum biocidal against bacteria and fungi and can be used as disinfectant cleaner for linen, recommended for use in hospitals, hotels and industries. It is also used in gynaecology, surgery, ophthalmology, pediatrics, OT, and for the sterilization of surgical instruments, endoscopes and surface disinfection.

In mice this disinfectant was found to cause infertility and birth defects when combined with Alkyl (60% C14, 25% C12, 15% C16) dimethyl benzyl ammonium chloride (ADBAC),. These studies contradict the older toxicology data set on quaternary ammonia compounds which was reviewed by the U.S. Environmental Protection Agency (U.S. EPA) and the EU Commission. In addition, DDAC, as well as other quaternary ammonia compounds, can lead to the acquisition of resistance by microorganisms when employed in sub-lethal concentrations.

See also 
 Dimethyldioctadecylammonium chloride – longer di-C18 analogue

References 

Antiseptics
Quaternary ammonium compounds
Chlorides
Cationic surfactants